Paul Kennedy (born 1945) is a British historian.

Paul Kennedy may also refer to:

 Paul Kennedy (English judge), criminal court judge, Interception of Communications Commissioner, on Gibraltar appellate court 
 Paul Kennedy (American judge), member of the New Mexico Supreme Court
 Paul Kennedy (broadcaster), sportscaster with Sun Sports and FSN Florida
 Paul Kennedy (host), broadcast journalist at the Canadian Broadcasting Corporation
 Paul Kennedy (Australian journalist), Australian journalist, television presenter and former Australian rules footballer